Matjaž or Matjaz is a given name. It may refer to:

King Matjaž, legendary king in Slovenia, as well as Croatia and elsewhere
Matjaž Brumen (born 1982), Slovenian handball player
Matjaž Ceraj (born 1983), Slovenian judoka
Matjaž Cvikl (1967–1999), Slovenian footballer who played in a forward role
Matjaž Debelak (born 1965), Slovenian ski jumper
Matjaž Florijančič (born 1967), former Slovenian football (soccer) player
Matjaz Godina (1768–1835), Slovene Lutheran pastor, writer and teacher in Hungary
Matjaž Kek (born 1961), former Slovenian footballer and a coach
Matjaž Klopčič (1934–2007), Slovenian film director and screenwriter
Matjaž Kopitar (born 1965), retired Slovenian professional ice hockey player
Matjaž Kozelj (born 1970), retired male butterfly swimmer from Slovenia
Matjaž Markič (born 1983), male breaststroke swimmer from Slovenia
Matjaž Mlakar (born 1981), professional handball player
Matjaž Perc (born 1979), Slovenian physicist
Matjaž Pograjc (born 1967, theatre director and one of Slovenia's most prominent theatre artists
Matjaž Rozman (born 1987), Slovenian footballer
Matjaž Schmidt (1948–2010), Slovene artist and illustrator, known for children's books illustrations
Matjaž Sekelj (born 1960), retired Slovenian professional ice hockey player
Matjaž Šinkovec (born 1951), Slovenian diplomat, politician, translator, journalist and science fiction writer
Matjaž Smodiš (born 1979), Slovenian professional basketball player
Matjaž Vrhovnik (born 1972), former Slovenian former alpine skier
Matjaž Zupan (born 1966), slovene ski jumper who competed for the former Yugoslavia from 1987 to 1994

See also
Matijevac
Mätja
Matazu

Slovene masculine given names